Transhood is a 2020 American documentary film directed and produced by Sharon Liese. The film follows four children, beginning at ages four, seven, twelve, and fifteen, as they "redefine coming-of-age".

The film premiered at the AFI Docs Festival on June 19, 2020 and was released on HBO and HBO Max on November 12, 2020.

Plot

Production 
The film was shot in parts of Kansas and Missouri, United States.

Release 
The film was released on HBO on November 12, 2020.

Reception 
Guy Lodge of Variety reviewed the film positively, stating that "Transhood maintains an artful bifocal perspective, capturing both youthful impatience and parental whiplash as it tracks the physical and emotional development of four trans children over the course of five years." Michael M. Weinstein of the Los Angeles Review of Books also reviewed the film positively, stating that "If there is one thing Transhood makes clear, it's that trans children are always already listening. Now, the onus is on us to hear them out." Aisle Seat's Mike McGranaghan scored the film 3.5/4 stars, saying that "the level of intimacy is what makes the film special."

Kyle Turner of The New York Times gave a negative review of the film, stating that "With so much ground to cover, the scenes' shortness can feel unsatisfying and even occasionally facile."

References

Further reading

External links 
 
 

2020 films
2020 documentary films
Transgender-related documentary films
2020 LGBT-related films
American LGBT-related films
American coming-of-age films
2020s coming-of-age films
2020s English-language films
2020s American films